The Sydney Metropolitan Women's Rugby League was the premier Women's rugby league competition in the state of New South Wales, Australia. In 2017, the competition became known as the NSWRL Women's Premiership. The New South Wales Rugby League also administer open age women's and age group girls' competitions that sit below the NSWRL Women's Premiership. Within the Sydney Metropolitan region, there are several conferences.

History
A regular women's rugby league competition was started in Sydney in the 1990s. This competition folded after the conclusion of the 2001 season. The Sydney Metropolitan Women's Rugby League restarted a competition in 2005. A meeting in March 2005 at the PCYC in Miller, south west of Sydney was the catalyst to get the women's competition up and running again.

Sydney Metropolitan - Rugby League Clubs with Women's Teams
In the 2021 season, the following Rugby League clubs field women's teams.

Combined Women's Open Age

 Como Jannali Crocodiles
 Forestville Ferrets
 La Perouse Panthers
 Leichhardt Wanderers
 Marrickville RSL Kings
 Mascot Jets
 North Sydney Brothers
 Redfern All Blacks
 Ryde Eastwood Hawks

Central Macarthur Western Women's Open Age

 All Saints Toongabbie Tigers
 Campbelltown Collegians Collie Dogs
 Hinchbrook Hornets
 Milperra Colts
 Moorebank Rams

Penrith and District - Open Womens 
The Penrith and District Junior Rugby League run and administer an Open Women's Rugby League competition. In 2021, the competition consists of the following teams.

 Blacktown City Bears
 Doonside Roos
 Emu Plains Emus
 Minchinbury Jets
 Mt Druitt Lions
 Penrith Waratahs
 St Clair Comets
 St Marys Saints

Sydney Metropolitan Women's Rugby League Clubs
In 2016, the Sydney Metropolitan Women's Rugby League included the following clubs.

Former clubs
Teams that participated in the SMWRL prior to the 2016 season include:
 Auburn
 Blacktown
 Cabramatta Two Blues 
 Canley Vale Kookas
 Canterbury-Bankstown Bulldogs
 East Campbelltown Eagles 
 Guildford Owls 
 Hawkesbury Hawkes
 Nepean
 Newtown Jetettes 
 Windsor Wolves
 Renown United
 Riverwood Legion 1995
 Sydney Bulls

Premiers

Premiership Tally 

Bold means the team still currently plays in the competition.

See also

Rugby league in New South Wales
New South Wales Women's Rugby League
Queensland Women's Rugby League
Western Australian Women's Rugby League

References

External links
 

Rugby league competitions in New South Wales
Rugby league in Sydney
Women's rugby league competitions in Australia
2005 establishments in Australia
Sports leagues established in 2005